Graven is a dark fantasy first-person shooter video game developed by Slipgate Ironworks and published by 3D Realms and Fulqrum Publishing. Often described as a spiritual successor to Hexen II, Graven incorporates elements of the action role-playing game and immersive sim genres to create an "action-adventure puzzler".

Gameplay

Graven is an open-ended journey through three expansive regions, where the player will encounter both dangerous enemies and friendly townsfolk.  Various hints, quests, and upgrades are obtained from the world's non-player characters. The player can find a wide variety of weapons and spells, each of which must be put to novel use in order to progress.  While some spells may be used offensively, most of the combat involves using medieval weapons against eldritch monsters.

The game supports solo play, split-screen co-op, and up to 4-player online play.

Plot

Players assume the role of a faithful priest of the Orthogonal order, exiled for a crime of retaliation against the order for sacrificing his adoptive daughter. The game begins with the priest adrift in a swamp, ferried by a stranger to solid ground. He bestows vague instructions, along with a mysterious staff and book. The priest embarks to hunt down the foul heretical sects responsible for conjuring plagues and twisting the natural order of the seasons.

Release

Graven was announced by 3D Realms and Slipgate Ironworks at the Realms Deep 2020 event on September 6, 2020. The announcement included a 30-minute gameplay reveal.

References

Early access video games
Upcoming video games
First-person shooters
Dark fantasy video games
3D Realms games
Nintendo Switch games
PlayStation 4 games
PlayStation 5 games
Unreal Engine games
Windows games
Xbox One games
Xbox Series X and Series S games
Video games developed in Denmark
Slipgate Ironworks games
Multiplayer and single-player video games
1C Company games